Los Vaqueros 3: La Trilogía (English: The Cowboys: The Trilogy) is the third solo studio album by Puerto Rican reggaeton artist Wisin. It is also the third installment of the "Los Vaqueros" series. The album was released on September 4, 2015. It was originally supposed to be on September 11, 2015. However, it got leaked online on August 30, 2015. Wisin would eventually release it early then the original date because of the pirating situation with the album.

Track listing

Charts

Certifications

References

2015 albums
Sony Music Latin albums
Albums produced by Luny Tunes
Spanish-language albums
Wisin albums